Panoquina panoquin, the salt marsh skipper, is a butterfly of the family Hesperiidae. It is found along the Atlantic Coast of the United States, from New York south to Florida and the Florida Keys, west along the Gulf Coast to southern Texas.

The wingspan is 35–39 mm. The wings are dark brown with pointed forewings. There are a few pale spots on the upperside of the forewings. The underside of the hindwings has yellow veins and a short white bar at the end of the cell. Adults are on wing from May to August in two generations in the north and from April to October in three generations in the south. In Florida, there are multiple generations with adults on wing from February to December. Adults feed on the flower nectar of a wide range of plants.

The larvae feed on Distichlis spicata.

References

Butterflies described in 1863
Panoquina
Butterflies of North America